Patrick Pugliese (30 October 1952 – 18 August 2020) was a Canadian water polo player. He competed at the 1972 Summer Olympics and the 1976 Summer Olympics.

References

External links
 

1952 births
2020 deaths
Canadian male water polo players
Olympic water polo players of Canada
Water polo players at the 1972 Summer Olympics
Water polo players at the 1976 Summer Olympics
Sportspeople from Hamilton, Ontario